James David Bristol (born June 23, 1933) is an American former manager in Major League Baseball in the 1960s and 1970s. He managed the Cincinnati Reds, Milwaukee Brewers, Atlanta Braves, and San Francisco Giants during this period.

Success in the minors, and with the Reds
Bristol attended high school at the Baylor School in Chattanooga, TN. He went on to University of North Carolina at Chapel Hill and Western Carolina University. A right-handed hitting and throwing infielder, he never played in the Major Leagues. Bristol became a playing manager in the Cincinnati farm system at the age of 24 with the Hornell Redlegs of the Class D New York–Penn League in 1957. By 1964, he was managing the Reds' top farm team, the San Diego Padres of the Pacific Coast League, where, at age 31, he won a pennant and playoff title—the fifth league championship of his eight-year career to date. In nine seasons (1957–65) as a minor league pilot, his teams won 652 games and lost 562 (.537).

In 1966, Bristol was named to the Reds' coaching staff, and when the team performed badly under rookie skipper Don Heffner, Bristol took over the club as manager on July 13. At 33, he was the youngest pilot in the Major Leagues that season through 1969. Bristol guided the Reds through 3 winning seasons, but he was dismissed following the  campaign. Sparky Anderson, who took over from Bristol, would go into the Baseball Hall of Fame as the leader of the "Big Red Machine".

Cincinnati (298–265, .529) represented the highwater mark of Bristol's managing career. He would never manage another winning club.

Later struggles as MLB manager

Not long after being fired by the Reds, Bristol was hired by the Seattle Pilots as the second manager in their history. Just six days before Opening Day, the Pilots got word they would be moving to Milwaukee as the Brewers. The Brewers under Bristol were never able to put together a winning team; he was fired 30 games into the 1972 season.

In 1976, Bristol was hired as manager of the Atlanta Braves. Midway through the  season, with the Braves mired in a 16-game losing streak, owner Ted Turner sent Bristol on a 10-day "scouting trip" and took over as his own manager. This only lasted for one game (a 2–1 loss to the Pittsburgh Pirates) before National League president Chub Feeney ordered Turner to give up the reins, citing major league rules which forbid managers or players from owning stock in a team. After the Braves broke the streak with third-base coach Vern Benson as interim manager, Bristol—who had returned to his offseason home in Andrews, North Carolina—was brought back to finish out what was at the time the worst season in the Atlanta portion of Braves history (61–101—including a 60–100 record by Bristol). He was fired at the end of the season. He last managed in MLB with the Giants late in the  season and all of  before he was replaced by Frank Robinson, prior to the 1981 season. In June 1980, Bristol got into a fight with Giants pitcher John Montefusco after a victory over the rival Los Angeles Dodgers. Montefusco was angry at Bristol for removing him from the game too early.  Bristol finished with a career managerial record of 657 win and 764 defeats (.462).

In addition to his rookie MLB season with Cincinnati, Bristol also served as the third-base coach of the Montreal Expos (1973–75) and Giants (1978–79), plus two terms with the Philadelphia Phillies (1982–85; 1988), and two additional stints with the Reds (1989; 1993).

In 2018, he was named to the Cincinnati Reds Hall of Fame.

References

External links

, or Baseball-Reference (Managers)

1933 births
Living people
American military personnel of the Korean War
Atlanta Braves managers
Bradford Beagles players
Cincinnati Reds coaches
Cincinnati Reds managers
Geneva Redlegs players
Hornell Redlegs players
Major League Baseball third base coaches
Milwaukee Brewers managers
Minor league baseball managers
Montreal Expos coaches
Ogden Reds players
Palatka Redlegs players
People from Cherokee County, North Carolina
Sportspeople from Macon, Georgia
Philadelphia Phillies coaches
San Francisco Giants coaches
San Francisco Giants managers
Sunbury Redlegs players
Topeka Reds players
Visalia Redlegs players
Wausau Lumberjacks players
Welch Miners players
West Palm Beach Sun Chiefs players